Tony Bowls (born Arkansas, USA) is a fashion designer and businessman who specializes in formal wear.

Early years 
Tony Bowls was born in England, Arkansas. As a child, he studied dance with Joel Ruminer, and through him became involved as a dancer at the Miss Arkansas pageant.  This exposure led to Bowls' entrance into the fashion and entertainment industries.

Career 
Tony Bowls was actively engaged in the prom, pageant and formalwear industries for over a decade before his first collection debuted. At age 28, he jump-started his career by opening a high-end dress shop. Through this self-owned and managed retail outlet, Bowls met, interacted with and designed for pageant and prom women, including Miss America and Miss USA contestants. His work in retail has inspired his claim that “hands-on sales involvement is high-octane fuel for his creative process”.

In 2004, Tony joined Mon Cheri to develop the Tony Bowls Collection. Since then, Bowls' gowns have been worn by Miss America 2009 Katie Stam and Miss America 2012 Laura Kaeppeler, as well as several other Miss America winners and contestants. He has also dressed contestants in the Miss USA, Miss Teen USA, and Miss Universe pageants. He is the official designer for the Miss America's Outstanding Teen Pageant. Most recently, Tony Bowls/Mon Cheri have been named the Official Evening Gown Sponsor of Miss America for the 2015 competition.

Following the success of the Tony Bowls collection, Bowls introduced Tony Bowls Paris, Tony Bowls Le Gala, Tony Bowls Evenings, and Tony Bowls Shorts Collections for prom and social occasion wear. Bowls' market has extended far beyond pageant stages; his dresses can be seen in stores and on red carpets internationally.

Celebrities including Carrie Underwood, Brooke Burke, Vanna White, JWoww, Twilight star Ashley Greene, Triple Crown winner Allison Alderson, HLN's Robin Meade, and The Bachelorette’s Emily Maynard have worn Bowls' gowns.  His dresses have been featured in Us Weekly, Seventeen Prom, and many other publications. Ellen DeGeneres endorsed Bowls and his work on her show. His designs have made other television appearances on The Real Housewives of Orange County, The Real Housewives of New Jersey, Dancing With the Stars, American Idol, Wheel of Fortune, and The Voice. Notably, drag performer Ginger Minj was criticized for wearing a gown that looked "cheap" by judge Michelle Visage on the program RuPaul's Drag Race, only to reveal it was a $5,000 gown by Bowls.

Awards and honors 
Bolws has won the DEBI (Distinctive Excellence in the Bridal Industry) award for Prom Designer of the year in 2011 and 2013. He was nominated for the DEBI award in 2012, and is nominated again for the upcoming 2014 awards.

References 

American fashion designers
High fashion brands